Calamothespis is a genus of praying mantis in the family Toxoderidae. It contains the following species:
Calamothespis adusta
Calamothespis aspoeckorum
Calamothespis condamini
Calamothespis congica
Calamothespis guineensis
Calamothespis kibweziana
Calamothespis lesnei
Calamothespis lineatipennis
Calamothespis nathani
Calamothespis oxyops
Calamothespis prosti
Calamothespis rourei
Calamothespis subcornuta
Calamothespis tanzaniensis
Calamothespis taylori
Calamothespis vansoni
Calamothespis vuattouxi

See also
List of mantis genera and species

References

 
Toxoderidae
Mantodea genera